The mixed doubles tennis event at the 2011 Summer Universiade will be held from August 16 to August 21 at the Longgang Tennis Center and the Shenzhen Tennis Center in Shenzhen, China.

Seeds
The first five seeds receive a bye into the second round

Draw

Finals

Top half

Bottom half

References
Mixed Doubles Draw

Mixed Doubles